Splendid Days is a 1960 Soviet drama film directed by Georgiy Daneliya and Igor Talankin.

Plot
Mother of five-year-old Seryozha has married for a second time and now Dmitri Korneyevich Korostelyov is officially his father. The boy calls Dmitri by his last name - Korostelyov, since Seryozha's stepfather also became the boy's best friend who helps solve small, but very important problems. Seryozha feels that the adult man perceives him as an independent person, can communicate with him as with a peer, respects his thoughts and acts. Korostelyov makes the boy's greatest dream come true - he buys him a bicycle. When the family begins expecting a new addition to the family - Korostelyov with Seryozha consults and discusses plans for the future.

Newly born little brother Lyonya diverts all of mother's attention and worries towards himself, and Seryozha begins to feel lonely and abandoned. In addition, his parents who are moving to another city where his father has found a new place of work, are going to leave Seryozha with a neighbor because of the boy's ill throat. But all of a sudden everything is happily resolved on the day of departure ...

Cast
Boris Barkhatov as Sergei
Sergei Bondarchuk as Dmitri Korneyevich Korostelyov, Sergei's stepfather
Irina Skobtseva as Marianna, Sergei's mother
Seryozha Metelitsyn as Vaska
Yura Kozlov as Zhenya
Lyubov Sokolova as Polina, Vaska's mother
Vasili Merkuryev as Uncle Kostya, the captain of the deep voyage
Aleksandra Panova as Aunt Pasha
Nikolai Sergeyev as Lukyanych the accountant
Clarina Frolova-Vorontsova as Aunt Zhenya
Alyosha Dotsenko as Shurik
Natasha Chechetkina as Lidka
Valentin Bryleev as petitioner
Vyacheslav Brovkin as Uncle Petya
Pavel Vinnik as toy seller
Margarita Zharova as Nadia Ivanova, a milkmaid
Pyotr Kiryutkin as a collective farmer in the club
Yevgeny Kudryashov as Alexei, projectionist

Production
The script was personally written by Igor Talankin, and Georgiy Danelia made a storyboard for him; he drew 505 frames of the future film. Before the beginning of the work, the directors agreed that everything is to be done together, each one has an opportunity to veto on any decision, but only every other day.

Initially, another actor was invited for the role of Korostelyov. However, the artistic council of the association did not approve this and recommended Sergei Bondarchuk to them. The young directors did not believe that Bondarchuk would agree to act in a directorial debut. But after reading the script, Sergei said that he liked the role.

The beginning of the shooting was scheduled for September 1959. Since the action of the picture takes place in the summer, it was decided to build the set in Krasnodar, where autumn has a large number of sunny days.

Awards
The best film of 1960 according to the survey of the magazine Soviet Screen
Grand Prix – Karlovy Vary International Film Festival 1960

References

External links

Soviet drama films
Russian children's drama films
Films directed by Igor Talankin
Films directed by Georgiy Daneliya
1960s children's drama films
1960 drama films
Soviet children's films